Count Mihály Teleki de Szék (20 April 1896 – 20 August 1991) was a Hungarian politician, who served as Minister of Agriculture between 1938 and 1940. After the Nazi occupation of Hungary he was the chairman of the governing Party of Hungarian Life. Teleki lived in emigration since 1945. He died in London, England at the age of 95.

References
 Magyar Életrajzi Lexikon	

1896 births
1991 deaths
Politicians from Budapest
People from the Kingdom of Hungary
Mihaly
Agriculture ministers of Hungary
Hungarian emigrants to the United Kingdom